Colosova (Kolosove, Kolosovo) is a commune in the Grigoriopol District of Transnistria, Moldova. It is composed of three villages: Colosova, Crasnaia Besarabia (Червона Бесарабія, Красная Бессарабия) and Pobeda (Побєда, Победа). It is currently under the administration of the breakaway government of the Transnistrian Moldovan Republic. The village of Colosova was part of the Glückstal Colonies, known during the 19th Century as Bergdorf and inhabited by Germans farmers.

References

Communes of Transnistria
Kherson Governorate